The Richmond Football Club, nicknamed the Tigers, is an Australian rules football team playing in the Australian Football League (AFL). Between its inception in the Melbourne suburb of Richmond in 1885 and 1907, the club competed in the Victorian Football Association (VFA), winning two premierships. Richmond joined the Victorian Football League (now known as the AFL) in 1908 and has since won 13 premierships, most recently in 2020.

Richmond's headquarters and training facilities are located at its original home ground, the Punt Road Oval, which sits adjacent to the Melbourne Cricket Ground (MCG), the club's playing home since 1965. Richmond traditionally wears a black guernsey with a yellow sash. The club song, "We're From Tigerland", is well known for its "yellow and black" refrain.

The club is coached by Damien Hardwick and its current co-captains are Dylan Grimes and Toby Nankervis. Five Richmond players have been inducted into the Australian Football Hall of Fame as "Legends" of the sport: Kevin Bartlett, Jack Dyer, Royce Hart, Kevin Sheedy and Ian Stewart.

History

Origins and VFA years (1885–1907) 

A short-lived football club named Richmond formed in 1860 with Tom Wills, one of the founders of Australian rules football, serving as its inaugural secretary and captain. Wills' cousin H. C. A. Harrison captained Richmond briefly in the early 1860s before moving to Geelong. This club was disbanded in 1871 and has no continuity to the present club. A number of teams formed in Richmond during the game's rapid expansion in the 1870s and early 1880s. However, all played at a junior level and it was considered an anomaly that Richmond, one of Melbourne's most prominent suburbs, did not boast a senior side. The wait ended when the Richmond Football Club was officially formed at the Royal Hotel in Richmond on 20 February 1885. A successful application for immediate admission to the Victorian Football Association (VFA) followed. The club shared the Punt Road Oval with the Richmond Cricket Club, one of the strongest cricket clubs in Australia which had been playing on the ground since 1856.

At first the team wore blue guernseys and caps with yellow and black stripes in the style of the Richmond Cricket Club. The football club soon adopted yellow and black as its official colours. The team was variously called the "Richmondites", the "Wasps" or, most commonly, the "Tigers".

During the late 1880s, Richmond struggled to make an impression in the VFA, and after a promising season in 1888 (when they finished fifth with eleven wins), the club slipped backwards, in the process losing players to more successful sides. As the local economy slipped into severe depression in the early 1890s and the crowds began to dwindle, some of the VFA's strongest clubs began to agitate for a reform of the competition. Richmond was not considered part of this elite group, which usually voted as a bloc at VFA meetings.

In 1896, Richmond walked off the field in a match against South Melbourne to protest the umpiring, and later in the season, the Tigers had their half-time score annulled against Essendon when it was discovered that they had too many men on the ground. In the closing three weeks of the season, Richmond's cut of the gate takings amounted to just five pounds, and they finished the season with the wooden spoon.

In October 1896, the cabal of six strong clubs broke with the association to form the Victorian Football League (VFL). As a struggling club with a poor following, Richmond was not invited to join the new league. Richmond's performances did not immediately improve in the depleted VFA until the turn of the century.

The Tigers were boosted by a significant country recruit in 1901. George "Mallee" Johnson was an instant sensation and the first true star player at the club. Richmond leapt to third place and then in 1902, with Johnson dominating the ruck, Richmond entered the closing weeks of the season neck and neck with Port Melbourne at the head of the ladder, but Port Melbourne faltered against Williamstown to hand Richmond its first flag. Having missed a potential bonanza from a premiership play-off, the VFA decided to emulate the VFL and introduce a finals series in 1903, a fateful decision for the Tigers. After recruiting the competition's leading goalkicker, Jack Hutchinson, and finishing the season as minor premier, Richmond lost both finals and were runner-up.

The following season, the club became embroiled in a feud with umpire Allen, whom the Tigers accused of failing to curb field invasions and, in particular, the dubious tactics of arch-rival North Melbourne. In the 10 September 1904 match, during which a significant number of Richmond players sustained serious gashes, and despite the earnest requests of the Richmond players, field umpire Allen refused to exercise his legitimate, official power to check the boots of the North Melbourne players for "spikes" on the soles of their boots. When the two clubs were scheduled to meet in the 1904 VFA Grand Final, Richmond announced that they wouldn't play with Allen as umpire. The VFA called Richmond's bluff, and appointed Allen as umpire for the match, meaning that the Grand Final was scratched and North Melbourne won the premiership on forfeit.

Richmond were now openly at odds with the VFA, and matters failed to improve in the next few years. The club was campaigning against violence (both on-field and among the crowd), ungentlemanly conduct and poor sportsmanship, issues that plagued the VFA to a far greater extent than the rival VFL since the 1896 split. Richmond cultivated links with some VFL clubs by playing practice matches against them. Richmond knew that they were a major asset to the VFA, had built up a large following and played on one of the best grounds in the competition, where they remained unbeaten for five years. In 1905, Richmond confirmed their status with a second premiership, this time overcoming bitter rivals North Melbourne, "Mallee" Johnson had moved to Carlton, but youngster Charlie Ricketts dominated the season and won plaudits among the pressmen, who voted him the best player in the VFA.

However, Ricketts was also lost to the VFL and injury hit the club hard. In 1906–07, the Tigers played finals without looking likely to win the flag. The club earned a rebuke from the VFA for scheduling a practice match against Geelong before the 1907 season, then went ahead with the commitment and earned further censure. Later in the year it became clear that the VFL wanted to expand its competition and Richmond won a place ahead of North Melbourne, which had been strengthened by an amalgamation with the bankrupt West Melbourne as part of their bid. Richmond were granted admission along with the now defunct University Football Club.

Entry into the VFL (1908–1944)

The first few seasons in the VFL were less than spectacular. Although the club turned up some star players, it let a lot of talent leave and the administration was unstable after George Bennett's death at the end of the 1908 season. In 1916, the side won its first wooden spoon while also playing in the finals for the first time – World War I having reduced the competition to just four clubs, finals qualification was automatic.

Finally, in 1919, Richmond made their first Grand Final appearance, losing to Collingwood. Richmond stoked a rivalry with Collingwood by recruiting their former skipper Dan Minogue as playing coach and gained vengeance by beating Collingwood in the 1920 VFL Grand Final to secure a first flag in the big league. This was followed by an even better performance the next year. The only club that continued to beat Richmond on a regular basis was Carlton. Finishing minor premier with only one loss for the season in 1921, Carlton were the hottest premiership favourite, yet Richmond managed to beat them in two classic finals matches played over successive weeks to go back-to-back.

The rest of the decade saw four more Grand Final appearances, all of which would end in frustration. From 1927 to 1929 Richmond became the first club in the VFL to lose three consecutive Grand Finals, all of which were to neighbouring archrivals, Collingwood.

The next VFL flag came in 1932, with Richmond's triumph over Carlton in a tough encounter which saw Richmond wingman Alan Geddes play the second half with a broken jaw. Another premiership came in 1934, this time against South Melbourne's famed "Foreign Legion", avenging Richmond's loss in the 1933 VFL Grand Final.

Prior to the commencement of the 1940 season, internal problems were brewing between the key personalities at the club. Some felt that the uneven performance of the team was due to Percy Bentley's coaching methods, and that he should be replaced. Jack Dyer walked out on the club and threatened to play in the VFA after his father, a committeeman who was involved with the anti-Bentley faction, lost his position at the board elections. Finally, the matter was resolved and Bentley kept his job, while Dyer returned to training on the eve of the season. The problems appeared to have been solved when Richmond won the semi-final against Melbourne to go straight into the 1940 VFL Grand Final. However, Melbourne reversed this result with a crushing win to pinch the premiership. Richmond had been out-thought by their old mentor Frank 'Checker' Hughes, who had assigned a tagger to negate Dyer. Dyer was furious that Bentley had done nothing to prevent his opponent taking him out of the game. The Richmond committee agreed with this assessment, so when Bentley (after retiring as a player) attempted to negotiate a higher fee to continue his coaching tenure, he was rebuffed. Incensed, Bentley quit Punt Road and moved to Carlton as coach, adding further spice to an already fierce rivalry between the two clubs.

Despite the tribulations created by the Second World War, Richmond was able to maintain a commendable level of consistency on the field. The club had quite a lot of players in reserved occupations who remained at home, while the administration became adept at securing star players who were temporarily in Melbourne on war service. Dyer was a fearsome presence in his role as playing coach, but he was unable to improve Richmond's ability to win finals matches. A loss in the 1942 VFL Grand Final to Essendon (after starting as favourite) meant that over the previous 18 years, Richmond had won two flags but been runner-up eight times. Jack Titus set a still unbeaten record of playing in six losing Grand Final teams. In 1943, Richmond broke through to beat Essendon in a thrilling Grand Final by five points, a win that the club dedicated to ex-player Bill Cosgrove, an RAF pilot who had been killed in action a few weeks before the match. But another Grand Final loss followed in 1944, when Dyer's team failed against Fitzroy on a very hot day.

Tough times at Tigerland (1945–1965)
In the immediate post-war era, despite an influx of excellent new players, Richmond struggled to make the four, appearing in the finals only once, in 1947. Dyer continued on as coach for three years after his playing retirement at the end of 1949, but was asked to retire by the committee who felt the club needed a shake up. Under a succession of coaches in the 1950s, With the demands of potential players increasing with each passing year, the club refused to allocate sufficient funds to recruit and they failed to replace star players as they retired. When stalwarts such as Des Rowe and dual-Brownlow Medallist Roy Wright left, the team slumped dramatically and finished with a wooden spoon in 1960.

In 1962 Graeme Richmond was appointed Secretary of the club, Richmond was the under 19's coach who had been around the club since the early 1950s as a junior player until knee injury stopped him from playing so he took on coaching.  Graeme understood that for Richmond to improve so would the recruiting. A shrewd businessman, Richmond was able to sign young recruits for bargain like fees. Royce Hart was given a suit and six shirts, and Kevin Bartlett simply walked in off the street. Graeme kept a close eye on the success former player Tom Hafey was having with Shepparton in the Goulburn Valley Football League. When coach Len Smith had a heart attack in 1965, the club appointed Jack Titus to serve as interim coach until a replacement could be found. Hafey was encouraged to apply, and the decision came down to Hafey and former club captain Ron Branton. Many expected Branton to get the job. However, Graeme Richmond saw something special in Hafey and he was appointed coach for the 1966 season.

Success through Hafey Era (1966–1982)

1966 heralded the start of the Tom Hafey era. Hafey, a former player of the club, was appointed coach and brought with him a couple of quality young footballers from northern Victoria.  Out of the Goulburn Valley came Dick Clay from Kyabram and Francis Bourke from Nathalia. Further afield were Doug Strang and John Perry from Albury and Wodonga.

On his return to Richmond, Hafey found the team had acquired a number of young, high quality players, Kevin Bartlett was a skinny 17 year old who lived locally and had walked in and asked for a tryout. Mike Green followed Kevin a year later. Even so, he quickly put his stamp on the club, bringing intensity and desire to reach the top. Although he acknowledged the ideas and tactical approach of Len Smith (who remained at the club as a selector and consultant), Hafey opted for what became his trademark style: kick the ball long and quickly into the forward line. He raised the bar for fitness among his players,[4] extending pre-season training and introducing a third training night during the week. Richmond quickly became known for being the fittest team in the competition.

Richmond began 1966 strongly. A month before the finals, they hit the top of the ladder for the first time since 1951 and seemed certain to play in September. However, two losses dropped the Tigers to fifth place with thirteen wins and a draw.  Richmond dismissed a number of players, replacing them with new players such as Royce Hart, Kevin Sheedy and Francis Bourke.

Richmond dominated the 1967 season, running out winners in a classic Grand Final against Geelong. In his first two years, the team lost only seven games and Hafey had gone from an unknown coach in the bush to the toast of the football world. In hindsight, the 1967 premiership marked a turning point for the game. The Tigers were fitter than any team that had gone before and were the highest scoring team since 1950. Australian football, after two decades of defensive-based play, was about to enter an era of high scoring, aided by rule changes, new tactics and better standards of fitness. They won the 1967 flag in a thrilling encounter with Geelong, ending a 24-year premiership drought.

The Tigers started the 1968 season slowly. They rallied to win the last six games, but missed the finals. When the Tigers were again lethargic in mid-1969, accusations of under-achievement arose and rumours that Hafey was on the way out circulated.  The players rallied behind Hafey and finished the season strong, taking fourth place. The team won all three finals, beat the much fancied Carlton in the 1969 VFL Grand Final by 25 points.

After missing the playoffs in 1970, Hafey took the Tigers to the finals for the next five years. Basing the team's strategy around all-out attack had drawbacks. Richmond were dominant in 1972 and were hot favourites in the 1972 VFL Grand Final against Carlton. However, Carlton stunned Richmond in a game of ridiculous high scoring. Even Richmond equalled the then record highest score in a Grand Final of 22.18 (150), but Carlton beat it with 28.9 (177). Richmond got their revenge in an intensely physical clash in the 1973 VFL Grand Final and went back-to-back in 1974 with a strong win against a resurgent North Melbourne.

By now, the aggressive attitude of the club both on and off the field had created resentment toward the club. A number of incidents during the 1973 Grand Final – the Windy Hill brawl, the attempted recruitment of John Pitura from South Melbourne and a poor reaction to Kevin Bartlett's failure to win the Brownlow medal – all focussed negative attention on the club. Hafey, however, used the resentment to his advantage, telling his players "it's Richmond against the world".

Richmond showed signs of ageing in 1975, when they lost in the preliminary final. Triple Brownlow medallist, Ian Stewart retired, Paul Sproule returned to Hobart, Brian Roberts and two others were part of the John Pitura trade. A raft of other player departures made for a poor 1976 season, Hart spent most of the year nursing a knee and Dick Clay opted to retire. The Tigers finishing seventh, Hafey's worst ever result. Internally the Richmond board bickering had flared into the public domain. It took a majority vote for Hafey to be reappointed for 1977, but not unanimously (he had no contract with Richmond, instead being appointed on a year-to-year basis). When it leaked that Graeme Richmond, the club's powerbroker, had voted against Hafey's reappointment Hafey immediately resigned.

The club appointed dual premiership player Barry Richardson as coach for two seasons before he was replaced by Tony Jewell. Richmond won its next premiership under Jewell with a then record-breaking margin of 81 points over arch-rivals Collingwood in 1980. After reaching and losing the 1982 VFL Grand Final, it has been a rocky road for Richmond who have struggled to come to grips with the rules and regulations of a modernised VFL, including the draft and salary cap. The successes of the early 1980s were bought at high financial cost through expensive recruiting, and were followed by severe cut backs that saw several top players depart.

Recruiting war (1983–1986)
Still smarting from the loss of star players to Collingwood, Richmond set themselves for war with Collingwood in 1984 by signing three of their players: John Annear, Craig Stewart and Phil Walsh. Not only were there big contracts and transfer fees to pay, but the costs of an expensive court action as well.

Richmond also signed a number of mediocre players on big contracts, and the club's financial situation took a battering. With the team failing to improve, a challenge to the committee was brewing and Richmond's traditional political stability threatened. The rebel group, organised by long-time servant Bill Durham, convinced former player and coach Barry Richardson to be leader. An election in late 1984 failed to clarify the situation.

Ian Wilson held on to the presidency into the new year. When the one hundredth birthday of the club arrived in February 1985, there was too much dissension to mark the moment fittingly. Eventually, Wilson handed over to Richardson, who had selected his former premiership teammate Paul Sproule to return from Tasmania and take over the coaching position on a guaranteed contract.

As the season progressed with Richmond still struggling, Sproule came under pressure. Richardson guaranteed his position, but at the end of the year, the committee overruled Richardson and sacked Sproule. Incensed, Richardson walked out of Punt Road, which was in turmoil again. Desperately, Richmond turned back to Tony Jewell, who was appointed coach for a second time, the only man in the club's history to get a second go at the job. Jewell later commented on the destruction wrought on the club during his four-year absence: "the supporters were gone, the members were gone, the money was gone, ... a real shame."

With the competition set to expand, Richmond made a number of misguided moves in 1986. To fill the vacancy left by Richardson, Richmond wooed high-flying West Australian entrepreneur Alan Bond to become president. Bond came with an agenda to raise money for the club by listing on the stockmarket and relocating to Brisbane. When the latter plan was revealed in the media, a furious reaction from supporters and high-profile club personalities buried the proposal almost immediately. Early in 1987, Bond's tenure at the club ended in farce when he resigned without presiding over a single game. The off-field confusion was reflected in the players' performance as Richmond slumped to only its second wooden spoon in 70 years.

Save Our Skins and a return to the finals (1987–1995)

Although the new president, ex-captain Neville Crowe, had stabilised the club and scored a coup by persuading club legend Kevin Bartlett to coach, the club managed to stay solvent by cutting expenses to the bone and paying only two-thirds of the allowable salary cap. But there was no money for recruiting to improve an impoverished playing list. The club struggled to come to terms with the draft after its inception in 1986, and made a number of poor choices—notably, the number one pick in 1987 was used on a player who had only four games with Richmond.

Finally, with the economy in serious recession and interest rates touching seventeen per cent, Richmond's creditors came knocking. At one point, an attempt was made to seize the club's 1973 and 1974 premiership trophies as securities for unpaid debts, an embarrassing situation. For a number of years, the exact amount that the club owed was not publicly known. After Bartlett came Allan Jeans, who then passed the job to ex-Richmond premiership player John Northey for 1993. Northey returned the team to the simple long-kicking style of the halcyon days under the legendary Tom Hafey. Along with some draft concessions granted by the AFL, Northey's efforts gradually improved Richmond. The team fumbled an opportunity to make the 1994 finals, then opened 1995 with its best start to a season in 75 years and eventually made it to the preliminary final. With a talented playing list and a strong administration led by Leon Daphne (Richmond's first president from the corporate world, the Alan Bond farce aside), Richmond looked set to become regular finalists again.

Lost opportunities (1996–2004)
The anticipated success failed to materialise, partly because Richmond allowed the coaching position to again become unstable. With over a year still to run on his contract, John Northey demanded a contract extension that the club refused. This was because of a rumour that some people with an association with the club were pursuing Essendon coach and former Richmond premiership player Kevin Sheedy. So Northey walked out on Richmond and accepted a longer-term contract to coach the Brisbane Bears. Richmond, caught short, appointed the Bears' ex-coach Robert Walls for 1996. After several humiliating thrashings in 1997, Robert Walls became the first Richmond coach to be sacked mid-season. After two-and-a-half seasons under Jeff Gieschen, the club appointed ex-St Kilda captain Danny Frawley. After a Preliminary Final appearance in Frawley's second season, Richmond overestimated the strength of the list and settled for trading for established players rather than drafting youth. Over the next three seasons, the team managed just 18 wins. The administration continued to support Frawley and ensured that he would see out his contract, a far cry from the way many of his predecessors were treated. However, midway through the 2004 season (a season in which Richmond only managed 4 wins, and lost their last 14 H&A matches), Frawley announced he would be relinquishing his role as Richmond coach at seasons' end.

Beginning to rebuild and another wooden spoon (2005–2007)

Under newly appointed head coach, Terry Wallace, the 2005 pre-season brought renewed optimism at the club. The Tigers held the no. 1 draft pick, selecting Brett Deledio who was touted as a future star and leader. However, the Tigers' first match of the season (against Geelong), quickly dashed that hope, as they were thrashed by 62 points. However, this loss would spark a change in the Tigers, and in the next 8 weeks of the season, they would go on to win 7 matches (the one exception being a 68-point loss at the hands of St Kilda in Round 5). This included wins over the then-reigning premiers, Port Adelaide, and over then-runners up, the Brisbane Lions. Sitting pretty at 7 wins and 2 losses, and 3rd on the ladder, the impossible prospect of finals football loomed large. However, in the Round 10 match against Melbourne, star player Nathan Brown suffered a horrible leg injury, that would sideline him for the rest of the season. They went on to lose the match by 57 points, and would only register 3 more wins for the season (one of those was against eventual premiers the Sydney Swans by one point, who had a one-point win against Collingwood the round before), eventually finishing 12th.

2006, a year which many experts predicted continued improvement for the Tigers, saw them lose their first H&A match by 115 points, against the Western Bulldogs, after which followed losses to St Kilda and West Coast. By the end of Round 3, things were looking grim for the Tigers once again. However, just as they did in 2005, the Tigers would respond to their poor start by winning 8 of their next 11 matches, and by the end of Round 14, the Tigers were in the Top 8 by a game and percentage. However, their spot in the Top 8 would be short lived, as 4 straight losses between Rounds 15 and 18 would effectively end their finals chances. They finished the 2006 season in 9th place, with 11 wins and 11 losses.

After promising seasons in 2005 and 2006, it was expected that the Tigers would take the next step in 2007, and play finals football. After massive hype in the off-season, the Tigers had a terrible start to the 2007 season, losing their first 9 matches (this included suffering their biggest ever defeat, at the hands of eventual premiers Geelong, by a whopping 157 points). Their first premiership points came in a draw against the Brisbane Lions in Round 10, and their first win of the season didn't come until Round 12 against fellow straggler Melbourne. After Round 18 of the season, the Tigers had registered a mere 1 win, 1 draw, and 16 losses, and were looking like recording their worst ever recorded season. However, late-season victories over old rivals Collingwood in Round 19, and Essendon in Round 21, saved them from this fate. They would eventually finish the year as wooden-spooners, with 3 wins, 1 draw, and 18 losses.

Centenary (2008)
After the end of the 2007 season, Richmond elected to delist Patrick Bowden, Brent Hartigan, Andrew Krakouer and Carl Peterson. These four joined another four players in leaving Punt Road—veteran Darren Gaspar, Kent Kingsley, Trent Knobel and Ray Hall. While these players left the club Jake King and Angus Graham were elevated off the rookie list.

Next up came the 2007 AFL Draft, in which the Tigers recruited highly rated midfielder Trent Cotchin with their first pick (No. 2 overall), backman Alex Rance (pick No. 18 overall) and ruckman Dean Putt (pick No. 51 overall). Then, in the pre-season draft, they elected to pick David Gourdis with the number one pick. The Tigers also picked Clayton Collard, Jarrod Silvester, Tristan Cartledge and Cameron Howat for the rookie list. Cam Howat had previously been on the rookie list but was delisted then picked up again.

Richmond began the 2008 season with a surprise win over Carlton, but from Rounds 2 to 11, registered only two more wins (and a controversial draw against the Western Bulldogs). The club fought back in the latter half of the season, winning eight of its last 11 matches. However, this was not enough to reach the finals, as Richmond finished two premiership points short (and percentage) of 8th placed Collingwood.

Wallace era ends (2009) 
At the start of 2009, Richmond was said to be rising as a team, and they would be in the eight . They had recruited former Brownlow Medal winner Ben Cousins – who had previously been released by the West Coast Eagles due to drug trouble – and they had rising stars in Brett Deledio and Trent Cotchin. However, the club was beaten by 83 points in Round 1 by Carlton, and did not register a win until Round 5, against North Melbourne. With a record of 2–9 after eleven weeks, Terry Wallace stepped down as coach, having announced his intention during the previous week. Jade Rawlings was announced as caretaker senior coach; he adopted a youth policy for the remainder of the year, which saw experienced players Joel Bowden and Matthew Richardson retire by the end of the year. Rawlings led Richmond to three wins and a draw from eleven games. Richmond finished fifteenth with a record of 5–16–1. On 25 August, Damien Hardwick was appointed to be the senior coach from 2010.

As Jade Rawlings, Craig McRae and Brian Royal left the Tigers assistant coaching panel, Brendon Lade and Justin Leppitsch were appointed as assistant coaches, leaving only Wayne Campbell as a previous Richmond assistant coach. Brendon Gale was also appointed CEO of the Tigers.

New coach, new list and a new beginning (2010–2012)

Richmond was not expected to be competitive in 2010, with many commentators predicting the team would win no more than four games. From the 2009 AFL Draft, the Tigers drafted seven new players, which included midfielder Dustin Martin. At the 2010 Pre-season Draft, Richmond recruited young key defender Dylan Grimes, brother of Melbourne defender Jack Grimes.

Damien Hardwick selected a young team at the start of the season, with four debutants, and only three players (Ben Cousins, Chris Newman and Troy Simmonds) over 25 in the Round 1 loss against Carlton. Richmond was winless after nine games, before a scrappy win over Port Adelaide in Round 10. This was the start of a turnaround in Richmond's form, with the team winning six out of eight games, to sit with a record of 6–12 after eighteen rounds. After losing the final four matches, Richmond finished fifteenth out of sixteen with a record of 6–16. Young key forward Jack Riewoldt finished the season with 78 goals, to win the Coleman Medal.

Very early in the season, Richmond were criticised for "partying too much" in the wake of its winless start to the season; after the Round 3 loss to the Sydney Swans, Richmond players were reported to be at the bar drinking and acting in a disorderly manner.

Richmond continued to show improvement to finish 12th out of 17 teams in 2011 with eight wins and a draw.

Jack Riewoldt again led the goalkicking with 62 majors, down on his previous year's tally of 78. Young midfielder Trent Cotchin won his first Jack Dyer Medal with 236 votes. Cotchin also polled the most votes of any Richmond player in the 2011 Brownlow Medal count with 15 votes. Dustin Martin was next best, polling 12 votes.

Richmond's 2012 season did not see an improvement from the previous three years, as they lost 6 games by 12 points or less and finished 12th for the second year running.   also beat them, while trailing by ten points with less than a minute remaining, the Tigers produced what former Sydney Swans coach Paul Roos labelled "the worst 47 seconds in footy" to lose by two points. They did, however, defeat both of the eventual grand finalists  and  during the season, the only team to do so the entire year. 2012 also saw Richmond have its first Brownlow Medallist in over 40 years when Trent Cotchin polled 26 votes to be the joint winner with Hawthorn's Sam Mitchell, due to a countback 4 years later after disqualified winner Jobe Watson was stripped of his medal due to the Essendon Football Club supplements saga.

Return to finals (2013–2016)

2013 saw Richmond claim a victory over Hawthorn (making it one of only two clubs that season to defeat the eventual premiers) and go on to qualify for its first finals series in over a decade. However, before 94,690 fans—the largest week-one crowd since the VFL/AFL adopted its current finals system—Richmond lost to Carlton in the first elimination final. Also that year, Peggy O'Neal, an American-born lawyer, became the AFL's first female club president when she got the position at Richmond.

After its drought-breaking finals appearance the previous year, Richmond failed to live up to expectations in the first half of the 2014 season, losing 10 of its first 13 matches and dropping to 16th place on the ladder. Despite public sentiment that the season was lost, the club rallied behind a five-goal performance by Cotchin to win against St Kilda. It catalysed a nine-match winning streak, with a Round 23 victory against eventual grand-finalists Sydney raising Richmond to 8th on the ladder and putting the club into its first back-to-back finals appearance since 1975. A 57-point loss to Port Adelaide in an elimination final knocked Richmond out in the first week of the finals. Cotchin won the Jack Dyer Medal for the third time in four years, making him the youngest Richmond player to win three club best and fairest awards.

Richmond faced the prospect of another disappointing season in 2015, losing 4 of its first 6 games. In the following weeks, however, the club registered 4 straight wins, including an upset victory over the previously undefeated Fremantle in Perth, and went on to defeat top-four teams Sydney and reigning premiers Hawthorn. Richmond would go on to win the final four games of the home and away season to finish fifth on the ladder. Facing North Melbourne in an elimination final, Richmond lost by 17 points in front of a crowd of 90,186, making it the club's third consecutive first weeks finals loss.

In 2016, Richmond failed to qualify for the finals for the first time in four years. Following a comprehensive Round 3 loss to Adelaide, coach Hardwick said the team would have to "take a little half-step back to go two steps forward." It would go on to be the story of the season with several major defeats including one against Greater Western Sydney in which Richmond registered its lowest score since 1961. The club debuted six players and brought in two recruits for their first games in the yellow and black.

Premiership success (2017–2020)

During the preseason period for 2016/17, Richmond made a number of changes to its playing list and coaching staff. Among these changes was the departure of Brett Deledio to Greater Western Sydney, in a three-way deal involving Geelong that saw the Tigers receive a 2017 first-round draft selection from the Cats, as well as a 2017 third-round selection from the Giants. Richmond also attained the services of Gold Coast Suns midfielder Dion Prestia, Geelong player Josh Caddy, and young Sydney Swans ruckman Toby Nankervis in preparation for the 2017 season.

Richmond began 2017 with 5 straight wins, a feat it had not achieved since 1995. A series of close losses hampered the Tigers throughout the middle of the season, including a 5-point loss to the Western Bulldogs, 2-point loss to Fremantle, and a 3-point loss to the Giants. Richmond ended the season strongly with convincing victories over Fremantle and St Kilda in the final two rounds, elevating the club to 3rd on the ladder. Richmond's first final of the season – their qualifying final against the Cats at the MCG – attracted a record qualifying final crowd of 95,028; the Tigers won by 51 points. This sent them to their first preliminary final since 2001, in which Richmond defeated Greater Western Sydney by 36 points in front of a crowd of 94,258 to progress to the Grand Final against Adelaide, their first Grand Final appearance since 1982. The attendance was 100,021, the largest crowd for a Grand Final since 1986. The Crows led at quarter time and were in front by as much as 13, but the Tigers took over the game as it progressed and kicked seven straight goals at one point with former South Australian U-19 captain Jack Graham finishing as the game's leading goalscorer after kicking three despite playing only his fifth game at AFL level. They eventually would win by 48 points – 16.12 (108) to Adelaide's 8.12 (60) – to end their 37-year flag drought. Dustin Martin also became the first player to win a Premiership medal, the Brownlow Medal and the Norm Smith Medal in the same season, while Damien Hardwick was named AFL Coaches Association Coach of the Year. Richmond's jump from 13th to premiers also marked the biggest jump from one AFL season to the next.

The reigning premiers were dominant throughout the 2018 season, winning their first minor premiership since 1982 with an 18–4 win–loss record. Richmond won all 17 of their games in Victoria during the home-and-away season, and broke the record for most consecutive wins at the MCG, winning 22 games at the venue (starting from round 14, 2017) and eclipsing the record of 17 set by Melbourne in 1955–56.

The Tigers defeated Hawthorn by 31 points in the first qualifying final at the MCG and were seemingly destined to win a second consecutive flag. However, they were stunningly denied a repeat Grand Final appearance after Collingwood defeated them by 39 points in the first preliminary final.

Jack Riewoldt had an outstanding year for Richmond, winning his third Coleman Medal after kicking 65 goals during the regular season, his second Jack Dyer Medal and receiving his third
All-Australian selection. Three other Tigers received All-Australian honours: Alex Rance (fullback), Dustin Martin (centre) and Shane Edwards (interchange), and four more were shortlisted in the initial 40-man squad: captain Trent Cotchin, Josh Caddy, Dylan Grimes and Kane Lambert. Exciting young forward/midfielder Jack Higgins capped off a stellar debut season by winning Goal of the Year for his highly memorable scissor-kick goal against Collingwood in Round 19.

At the conclusion of the season, Richmond acquired former  co-captain Tom Lynch via free agency on October 8. In addition, Ben Griffiths retired in January to pursue a college football career in the United States and Shaun Hampson retired on June 26, citing a chronic back condition.

Richmond were looking to rebound in 2019 after the bitter disappointment of their unexpected preliminary final exit. They suffered various setbacks during the first half of the season, with several of their best players sidelined, most notably Alex Rance who suffered a career-ending ACL injury in Round 1 against Carlton. The Tigers were resilient in spite of their misfortune, winning six games in a seven-game stretch from round four to round 10. Despite a midseason slump where three losses on the trot dislodged them from the top eight, the Tigers re-emerged from the mid-year bye a different team and would not lose again for the rest of the season. They won their last nine games of the home-and-away season and finished third on the ladder with a 16–6 win–loss record, trailing minor premiers Geelong and second-placed Brisbane on percentage.

They would defeat both teams en route to their second grand final in three years, dispatching the Lions by 47 points in the second qualifying final at the Gabba (marking their first interstate finals victory) before coming from 21 points down at half time to beat the Cats by 19 points in the second preliminary final at the MCG. They met Greater Western Sydney in the 2019 AFL Grand Final on September 28, thrashing the Giants by 89 points – their biggest ever win in a grand final, eclipsing their 81-point victory over Collingwood in 1980. Martin won his second Norm Smith Medal, becoming just the fourth to win multiple Norm Smith Medals after Gary Ayres, Andrew McLeod and Luke Hodge. Cotchin equaled Dan Minogue, Percy Bentley and Royce Hart with his second Premiership as Richmond captain while Hardwick became the Tigers' first multiple Premiership coach since Tom Hafey – whose widow Maureen presented the two of them with the Premiership cup. Richmond also chose to debut Marlion Pickett, who they had drafted midseason following Grigg's retirement and who had won the Norm Goss Medal in the VFL Grand Final against Williamstown the previous week. Pickett not only became the first player to make his senior debut in an AFL or VFL Grand Final since Keith Batchelor for Collingwood in 1952, but he also kicked his first AFL goal in the third quarter and finished with four Norm Smith Medal votes.

Despite some off-field indiscretions during the 2020 season and playing most of the season interstate due to the COVID-19 pandemic, the reigning premiers finished in the top four for the fourth consecutive season, qualifying in third place with 12 wins, four losses and a draw after a shortened 17-match home-and-away season. Richmond faltered against the Brisbane Lions in the qualifying final, but recovered to play in their third Grand Final in four years after defeating St Kilda by 31 points in the semi final and pipping minor premiers Port Adelaide by six points in the preliminary final. The Tigers would meet Geelong at the Gabba in the first VFL/AFL Grand Final to be played outside Victoria, and despite trailing the Cats by 22 points deep in the second term, Richmond scored 10 of the final 12 goals of the match to run out 31-point winners. It marked their third premiership in four years and also made them the first team since Hawthorn completed their three-peat in 2015 to win consecutive premierships. Martin, who kicked four goals, became the first-ever three-time Norm Smith Medalist, while Cotchin became the club's first-ever three-time Premiership captain.

End of a dynasty (2021) 

The Tigers’ four-year era of success would come to a halt in 2021. Despite a decent start to the year, winning seven of their first 12 matches, the reigning premiers would fall away rapidly to win just two of their last 10. With a season record of nine wins, 12 losses and a draw, Richmond finished 12th and missed the finals for the first time since 2016. The Tigers became the fourth team in five years to miss the finals after playing in the previous year’s grand final, following 2016 premiers the Western Bulldogs, 2017 runners-up Adelaide and 2019 runners-up Greater Western Sydney. 

At the conclusion of the season, triple-premiership captain Trent Cotchin relinquished his role as skipper, and Dylan Grimes and Toby Nankervis were appointed as co-captains for the 2022 season.

Finals return (2022) 

Richmond were looking to rebound quickly from their poor 2021 season. Despite some inconsistent form throughout the 2022 season, which included dispiriting losses to also-rans Gold Coast and North Melbourne, and a low-scoring draw against Fremantle, the Tigers were able to secure an eighth finals berth in 10 seasons, finishing seventh on the ladder with 13 wins, eight losses and one draw. However, their finals campaign came to an early end after a heart-breaking two-point loss to Brisbane in a high scoring elimination final.

Club identity and culture
Initially, Richmond saw itself as a gentlemanly and sportsman-like club; it even went to the extent of sacking a player who used poor language. During the early 1900s, the club used the press as a forum to publicise a campaign against violence in the game, which earned the derision of some rival clubs. This image followed the club into the VFL in 1908 and during the First World War the club emphasised the number of men associated with the club who had enlisted and served overseas. But the club's actions in 1916, when it voted with three other clubs seen as representative of the working class (Collingwood, Fitzroy and Carlton) to continue playing football, left no doubt as to which side of the class divide that the Tigers belonged. The club's self-consciously non-confrontational image can be partly attributed to two of its long serving presidents—George Bennett (1887–1908) and Frank Tudor (1909–1918). Both were Richmond men and respected parliamentarians who took the view that how the game was played was more important than whether the game was won.

After World War I, the club's attitude hardened as they attempted to match it with the then power clubs Collingwood and Carlton. Eventually, the Tigers became more prosaic in their approach to recruiting and training.

The Hafey era transformed Richmond into one of the most feared combinations in the then VFL. The club's football administrator, Graeme Richmond, drove the "win at all costs" mentality across the whole club, making Richmond a formidable force, winning five premierships from 1967 to 1980.

Since the Tigers' grand final appearance in 1982, the club appeared in five finals series (1995, 2001, 2013, 2014 and 2015) before winning another preliminary final and eventually breaking their Premiership drought as board and coaching instability during the 1980s and 1990s distracted the club and forced its focus away from becoming an on-field force.

The club also hosts the Korin Gamadji Institute (KGI) at Punt Road, which has delivered highly-unique and innovative leadership and well-being programming for young Indigenous boys and girls since 2008. In 2018, Richmond became the first sports club to present at the United Nations Permanent Forum on Indigenous Issues.

Guernseys
The club's current home jumper design is black and features a yellow sash running from the top left of the jumper to the bottom right. For away games against teams with dark coloured jumpers, the club wears a clash strip with a reverse of this design, a black sash on a yellow base. In its first season, Richmond wore a blue jumper with a thin yellow-and-black sash running from right to left. Between 2011 and 2016, the club guernseys were manufactured by sportswear company BLK, who were known as KooGa Australia prior to 2014, before it went into receivership in November 2016. Puma manufactures the club's on-and-off field apparel. With the change to Puma, the yellow used is reasonably lighter than the sash seen in the past few years.

Uniform evolution
Richmond's uniform changes throughout their history.

Song
Initially, Richmond's club song was "Onward the Tigers", set to the tune of the traditional Australian bush ballad "Waltzing Matilda". In 1962, Jack Malcomson, a cabaret singer who was performing regularly at the Richmond Football Club Social Club, was approached to write a new club song and adapted "Row, Row, Row" (Monaco/Jerome), a show tune from the Ziegfeld Follies of 1912, to create We're From Tigerland. The current version of the song used by the club is a 1972 recording performed by the Fable Singers. In 2014, the Herald Sun named it the top club song of any AFL team. Tigerland is noted for the line "Yellow and black", which fans of the club shout when the song is performed at games.

 Oh, we're from Tigerland
 A fighting fury, we're from Tigerland
 In any weather, you will see us with a grin
 Risking head and shin
 If we're behind, then never mind
 We'll fight and fight and win
 For we're from Tigerland
 We never weaken 'till the final siren's gone
 Like the tiger of old
 We're strong and we're bold
 For we're from Tiger
 Yellow and black
 We're from Tigerland

Stadium

The club's home ground is the Melbourne Cricket Ground (MCG) where the team plays most of their home matches in the regular season. The MCG has a capacity of 100,024 and the club usually draws large attendances against Victorian clubs, particularly rivals such as Essendon, Collingwood, Carlton and Hawthorn.

The club also plays home games against local and interstate clubs with smaller supporter bases in Melbourne at the smaller capacity Docklands Stadium.

Richmond's training ground and base of operations is located at the Punt Road Oval, currently branded as the Swinburne Centre, located a few hundred metres from the MCG.

Administration and corporate
Club administration since 1908

Supporter base
Richmond has a large supporter base which is known for its dedication, including its personal cheer squad who attend both home and away matches for the club. The club broke its membership record, along with the all-time AFL membership record, when 100,196 signed up in 2020. It also has the most members of any Australian sporting team.

The building of the fan base was a slow process for Richmond. In the 1890s, the club never sold more than 300 season tickets, but the following was built up with success in the VFA and membership numbered about 2,000 at the time of admission to the VFL in 1908. Between the wars, the club captured the imagination of the residents of Richmond. The successful Tigers were a positive motif for the oppressed working class community which suffered deprivation during the Great Depression. At this time, the Richmond community was almost half Catholic, and this demographic was reflected in the club among the players and officials.

As Melbourne dramatically spread out in the post-war years, so too did the Richmond supporters. Many were now concentrated in the eastern suburbs, which eventually formed the club's metropolitan recruiting zone. Indeed, at one point during the early development of the Waverley Park ground, the Tigers considered making the stadium its home for this reason.  Following the barren period of the 1950s, Richmond was able to tap into the large number of fans by moving home matches to the MCG and almost doubled attendance figures. The Tigers maintained this advantage over the other clubs until the mid-1980s, when poor administration led to a downturn in every area of the club. As the club struggled for funds, the membership plummeted from over 10,000 to under 3,000.

The greatest display of loyalty from the fans occurred during 1990. Threatened by liquidation, the supporters rallied to pay off the multimillion-dollar debt via the "Save Our Skins" campaign. In 2011, the club launched the Fighting Tiger Fund to reduce the club's debt and to allow it to increase spending on the football department in order to be more competitive on field.

In 2013, the club launched The Roar is Back membership promotion aiming at signing up 60,000 members in a season for the first time ever. Following a successful campaign, on 24 June 2013, Richmond chief executive Brendon Gale confirmed that membership had passed 60,000. The club created a limited edition commemorative Sherrin football to celebrate the achievement and it was distributed free to families at the 'Thank you for 60,000 members BBQ/Training Morning' at Punt Road Oval on 29 June 2013. The official membership total for 2013 was 60,321.

For statistical purposes 30 June is the cut-off date for membership numbers although it does continue to sell memberships. In 2013, after 30 June the club commenced bundling 2013 and 2014 membership years into a special "Sign up as a member for 2014 and get the rest of 2013 free!" offer. The 2014 membership total of 66,122 gave Richmond the 3rd biggest membership base in the AFL behind Collingwood and Hawthorn (80,793 and 68,650 respectively). This record was again broken in 2015 with the club signing up 70,809 members, still ranking 3rd in total membership numbers. The club averaged the highest crowds in the AFL of 49,841 in 2015, home crowd averaged 53,236 the highest in the 2015 AFL season. The Richmond Football club created AFL/VFL history in 2018 by becoming the first club ever to reach 100,000 members.

Membership 

Club records in bold text.

 Includes three finals in 1995, 2001, 2017, 2019; two finals in 2018 and one final in 2013, 2014, 2015. 
 2020 crowds were significantly affected due to the COVID-19 pandemic. 
 Crowds during the second half of the 2021 season were also significantly affected by the COVID-19 pandemic excluding matches in Perth.

Cheer squad 
The Official Richmond Cheer Squad is an organised group of passionate supporters who attend every Richmond game whether in Melbourne or interstate.  There are also supporter groups located in each state of Australia.

Club honour board

Premiership teams
See Richmond premiership teams

Richmond Team of the Century
In 1998, Richmond announced its Team of the 20th Century. The selection of the 22 players shows an even spread of champions from all the eras of the club: Thorp from the club's first premiership wins of 1920–21; McCormack, Strang, Titus and Dyer from the inter-war years; Rowe, Morris and Wright from the battling era after the war; Richardson and Knights from recent times. But the great days from the late 1960s to the early 1980s provide the bulk of the side: Sheedy, Green, Keane, Bourke, Barrot, Clay, Hart, Dean and Bartlett who made up the core of Tom Hafey's teams, and later success stories Weightman and Raines. Ian Stewart, named on the bench, managed selection in a team of the century at two clubs—he was named in the centre of St Kilda's team as well. Richmond has four players denoted below with an asterisk who are also members of AFL Team of the Century. This is the second-most of any club.

Australian Football Hall of Fame members
As legends of the game:
Jack Dyer (inaugural "Legend")
Kevin Bartlett
Ian Stewart
Royce Hart
Kevin Sheedy
As players of the game:
Percy Bentley
Francis Bourke
Dan Minogue
Bill Morris
Charlie Pannam
Vic Thorp
Jack Titus
Dale Weightman
Roy Wright
Matthew Richardson
Maurice Rioli

As coaches of the game:
Tom Hafey
Frank 'Checker' Hughes

Richmond Hall of Fame
The Richmond 'Hall of Fame' was created in 2002, with 24 inaugural inductees. Since then there have been a further ten batches of inductees added, most recently in 2019, for a total of 63 members. Below is a list of members, their contributions to the club, and the year they were inducted. To date, eight Richmond "Immortals" have been named, the highest level of honour within the Hall of Fame. The first of these was Jack Dyer, who was immediately made an 'immortal' upon his induction into the Hall of Fame in 2002, the year before his death.

The Immortals are highlighted in yellow in the table below and have their names in bold.

"100 Tiger Treasures"
During the centenary season the tigers announced their 100 Tiger Treasures consisting of 10 awards, each with 10 nominees given by the Richmond Football Club in 2008 to celebrate their centenary year of competition in the VFL/AFL. The awards were mostly given to players but also club moments and campaigns. On Saturday, 28 June  held a centenary celebration at Punt Road Oval before the centenary game at the MCG against arch rivals  later that day.

Captains

Coaches

Records

Club records and achievements

Win–loss records

Career records

Single-game records

Single-season records

Individual awards

Brownlow (VFL/AFL Best & Fairest)
Stan Judkins – 1930
Bill Morris – 1948
Roy Wright – 1952, 1954
Ian Stewart – 1971
Trent Cotchin – 2012
Dustin Martin – 2017

Coleman (VFL/AFL leading goalkicker)
George Bayliss – 1920
Jack Titus – 1940
Dick Harris – 1943
Michael Roach – 1980, 1981
Jack Riewoldt – 2010, 2012, 2018

Norm Smith (Grand Final Best & Fairest)
First Awarded 1979
Kevin Bartlett – 1980
Maurice Rioli – 1982
Dustin Martin – 2017, 2019, 2020

AFL Rising Star
First Awarded 1993
Brett Deledio – 2005

Mark of the Year
Michael Roach – 1979
Geoff Raines – 1982
Michael Mitchell – 1990
Shai Bolton - 2021

Goal of the Year
Geoff Raines – 1984
Michael Mitchell – 1990
Daniel Rioli – 2017
Jack Higgins – 2018

All-Australian selection
First Awarded 1953
Des Rowe – 1956
Roy Wright – 1956
Neville Crowe – 1966
Royce Hart – 1969
David Cloke – 1979
Bruce Monteath – 1979
Michael Roach – 1979
Jim Jess – 1980
Geoff Raines – 1980
Mark Lee – 1980, 1983, 1985
Maurice Rioli – 1983, 1986
Dale Weightman – 1985, 1986, 1988
Wayne Campbell – 1995, 1999
Matthew Richardson – 1996, 1999, 2008
Matthew Knights – 1998
Andrew Kellaway – 2000
Darren Gaspar – 2000, 2001
Brad Ottens – 2001
Joel Bowden – 2005, 2006
Jack Riewoldt – 2010, 2015, 2018
Trent Cotchin – 2012
Brett Deledio – 2012, 2015
Alex Rance – 2014, 2015, 2016, 2017 (captain), 2018
Dustin Martin – 2016, 2017, 2018, 2020
Shane Edwards - 2018
Dylan Grimes - 2019
Bachar Houli - 2019
Shai Bolton - 2022

AFL Coaches Association Champion Player of the Year
Trent Cotchin – 2012
Dustin Martin – 2017

AFL Coaches Association Coach of the Year
Damien Hardwick – 2017

AFL Players Association Most Valuable Player
Dustin Martin – 2017

International Rules Series representatives
Commenced 1998
Matthew Richardson – 1996, 1999, 2008
Wayne Campbell – 1998, 1999, 2000
Andrew Kellaway – 2000, 2002
Darren Gaspar – 2001
Brad Ottens – 2001
Joel Bowden – 2001, 2004
Nathan Brown – 2003, 2004
Brett Deledio – 2005
Chris Newman – 2005
Andrew Raines – 2006
Jack Riewoldt – 2010
Jake King – 2011
Robin Nahas – 2011

22 Under 22 team selection
Alex Rance – 2012
Dustin Martin – 2012, 2013
Trent Cotchin – 2012
Brandon Ellis – 2013, 2014, 2015
Daniel Rioli – 2017
Jayden Short – 2018
Dan Butler – 2018
Sydney Stack – 2019
Liam Baker – 2020
Noah Balta – 2020
Shai Bolton – 2021

Club Best & Fairest
See Jack Dyer Medal

Club leading goalkicker
See Michael Roach Medal

Current squad

Reserves team
Richmond has had a reserves team participate in various competitions since the early 20th century. The reserves competition for the then-Victorian Football League (now trading as the Australian Football League) began in 1919 and the Richmond reserves recorded its first premiership in 1929. In the following 68 years, Richmond went on to win a further eight premierships in reserve-grade football. The Richmond reserves participated in the VFL/AFL reserves, then the Victorian State Football League up to the 1999 season, then in the new Victorian Football League competition in 2000.

In 2001, the Richmond reserves team was dissolved and the club entered a reserves affiliation with the Coburg Football Club in the VFL, using the latter as a feeder team. This arrangement lasted from 2001 until 2013.

Richmond ended the affiliation at the end of 2013, seeking to re-establish a more direct developmental structure by operating a stand-alone reserves team. The reformed Richmond (VFL) reserves team has played in the VFL since 2014, playing its home games at the Punt Road Oval, with many staged as curtain raisers to the club's senior home and away games at the nearby Melbourne Cricket Ground. The team is made up of a combination of senior listed AFL players, rookie listed players and VFL exclusive contracted players.

Past premierships

Best and fairest award

Women's football
The Richmond Football Club fields a team in the premier national league for women, the AFL Women's competition. The club entered the league in 2020. For two seasons in 2018 and 2019, the club also fielded a team in the state-league level VFL Women's competition.

The program, including development pathways, is presently overseen by the women's football operations manager, Kate Sheahan.

History
Richmond has a thin history with women's football, with the club connected to just two women's matches in the 20th century. The first occurred in 1923, with a team dubbed the "Tigresses" playing off against the club's junior men's team (Cubs) as a fundraiser for a VFL team's interstate trip. As was the case with women versus men charity matches in that era, the men's team competed in the match in full fancy dress attire. In what was a non-serious affair the women's side (9.14 (68)) defeated the scoreless cubs side. In August 1933, however, an all women's match was held between teams representing the suburbs of Richmond and Carlton in a charity match. While the Carlton team was associated with the club itself, Richmond did not pair with the side that played under its moniker. The match, played at Carlton's home ground, Princes Park, drew an estimated crowd of 10,000 and raised funds as part of a VFL bye-week carnival for the Royal Melbourne Hospital.

AFL Women's team
In 2016, Richmond was among 13 AFL clubs to bid for licenses to compete in the soon to be formed AFL Women's competition. The club was one of five to miss out, instead being awarded provisional licenses guaranteeing access in later expansions. The following year they would again bid, this time winning the right to entry into the competition's fourth season, to be held in 2020. The club's first player signing came in the April 2019 expansion signing period, securing former  captain Katie Brennan, who would go on to captain the club in its first season in the league.

Current squad

Season summaries

^ Denotes the ladder was split into two conferences. Figure refers to the club's overall finishing in the home-and-away season.

VFL Women's team
In October 2017, Richmond was granted a license to field a team in the 2018 VFL Women's season. They were one of 13 clubs in the competition that season, including all 10 Victorian-based AFL clubs. The league operated in the winter season (separately to the AFLW competition). Former men's VFL assistant coach Tom Hunter was named the team's head coach in November 2017 and served in the role over the 2018 and 2019 seasons. Jess Kennedy was named the team's inaugural captain in May 2018. After two seasons in the competition and following the cancellation of the 2020 season due to the impacts of the COVID-19 pandemic, the club withdrew from the competition and entered into an alignment with the Port Melbourne Football Club.

Season summaries

Wheelchair football
Richmond has had a team compete in the Victorian Wheelchair Football League since its inception in 2018. The team were runners up in 2018 before winning the league premiership in 2019. After a two-year hiatus due to the suspension of the 2020 & 2021 seasons as a result of the COVID pandemic, Richmond won their second league premiership as well as the development league premiership in 2022.

See also
List of Richmond Football Club seasons
List of Richmond Football Club players
List of Richmond Football Club coaches

Notes

References

Bibliography
Blainey, G: A Game of Our Own: The Origins of Australian Football, Melbourne 1990
Hansen, B: Tigerland, Richmond Past Players and Officials Assoc, Melbourne 1992
Hogan, P: The Tigers Of Old, Richmond FC, Melbourne 1996
Richmond Football Club – Hall of Fame

External links

 

 
Australian Football League clubs
Australian rules football clubs established in 1885
Australian rules football clubs in Melbourne
Former Victorian Football League clubs
1885 establishments in Australia
Sport in the City of Yarra
Sport in the City of Melbourne (LGA)